Kaikilani (16th-century-17th-century), also known as Kaʻikilani nui aliʻiwahine ʻo Puna, was a High Chiefess and ruler Aliʻi Nui of Hawaiʻi island. She was a legendary figure in Hawaiian native oral tradition who dates to around the 16th century in the western calendar. Her father was Kukaʻilani and mother was Kaohukiokalani, both half-blood siblings of their father, Kealiʻiokaloa, ruling chief of Hawai'i Island.

She was married to Ali'i Lonoikamakahiki (not to be confused with the god Lono), son of Keawe-nui-a-‘Umi, and heir to the throne of Hawai'i island, the moiship. When the king died Lono did not feel he was ready for the responsibility of kingship and declined to rule until he had mastered the martial skills. Hawai'i Island was divided into three separate districts. Kona and Kohala had two rulers, Kanaloa-kua'ana and 'Umi-o-ka-lani; Ka-'u and Puna were ruled by Lono-i-ka-makahiki; Hilo and Hamakua we're ruled by Kumalae-nui-a-'Umi and his son, Makua. Kaikilani ruled as the first chiefess in Hawaiian history. When Lono had shown his martial skills to the satisfaction of his subjects he returned and took up the throne as Co ruler with Kaikilani.

A crater on the planet Venus has been named Kaikilani in her honour, see List of craters on Venus.

References 

Fornander collection, Fornander, Abraham Fornander Collection of Hawaiian Antiquities and Folk-Lore. Accessed March 2016
 Myths & legends of our new possessions & protectorate by Skinner, Charles M. (Charles Montgomery), 1852–1907, Published 1900, Accessed March 2016
 Lono and Kaikilani , Retold from King Kalakaua's The Legends and Myths of Hawai'i
 Kaikilani%5D in the  Hawaiian Legends Index http://manoa.hawaii.edu/hawaiiancollection/legends/subjectsearch.php?q=Kaikilani
 David Kalakaua:The Legends and Myths of Hawaii

Hawaiian legends
House of Līloa
 
16th-century women rulers
17th-century women rulers
17th-century monarchs in Oceania